From List of National Natural Landmarks, these are the National Natural Landmarks in New Jersey.  There are 11 in total, many of them are related to the glacial geology, especially the Wisconsin Glacier and the Glacial Lake Passaic that it created over a large portion of northern New Jersey.

New Jersey
National Natural Landmarks